The Woman in Doctor's Garb (German: Die Frau im Doktorhut) is a 1920 German silent comedy film directed by Rudolf Biebrach and starring Lotte Neumann and Felix Basch.

The film's sets were designed by the art director Hans Sohnle.

Cast
In alphabetical order
 Felix Basch as Dr. George Hill 
 Charlotte Ewald as Henrika Mondschein 
 Erich Heinz Hentschke as Mendelin Kümmerlein 
 Lotte Neumann as Dr. Lily Guyot 
 Neumann-Schüler
 Marie Rappeport as Zofe Lissy 
 Ferry Sikla as Siegmund Meyer I. 
 Max Wilmsen as Diener Fritz

References

Bibliography
 Grange, William. Cultural Chronicle of the Weimar Republic. Scarecrow Press, 2008.

External links

1920 films
Films of the Weimar Republic
Films directed by Rudolf Biebrach
German silent feature films
1920 comedy films
German comedy films
German black-and-white films
Silent comedy films
1920s German films